Pamanbar (also Romanized as Pāmanbar) is a village in Karian Rural District, in the Central District of Minab County, Hormozgan Province, Iran. At the 2006 census, its population was 209, in 46 families.

References 

Populated places in Minab County